Highway 32 is a national highway in Thailand.

It begins in Bang Pa-In District in Phra Nakhon Si Ayutthaya Province at the junction of Phahonyothin Road (Thailand Route 1) and the Outer Bangkok ring road (Motorway 9), then passes through the provinces of Ang Thong, Singburi, and Chainat, where it merges back into Phahonyothin Road directly at the border with Nakhon Sawan Province.

Until the mid-1990s, this highway was tolled. Two toll booths are still there today, but are now used as an administration building.

Compared with other long haul routes in the same direction, Highway 32 provide a shorter and faster way from Bangkok to Nakhon Sawan and Northern Thailand. It belongs to the Asian Highway Network's AH1 and AH2 and the Kunming-Bangkok Expressway.

From 2008 to 2009, due to the high volume of traffic between Bangkok and Nakhon Sawan, the highway was expanded from four lanes to six lanes and in some sections eight lanes.

References

 ThinkNet:Road Map of Thailand. MapMagic CD + Paper Map.Multi-Purposes Bilingual mapping software, Bangkok, 2008 edition.

AH1
National highways in Thailand
Phra Nakhon Si Ayutthaya province
Ang Thong province
Sing Buri province
Chai Nat province
Nakhon Sawan province